A transient-voltage-suppression (TVS) diode, also transil or thyrector, is an electronic component used to protect  electronics from voltage spikes induced on connected wires.

Description 
The device operates by shunting excess current when the induced voltage exceeds the avalanche breakdown potential. It is a clamping device, suppressing all overvoltages above its breakdown voltage. It automatically resets when the overvoltage goes away, but absorbs much more of the transient energy internally than a similarly rated crowbar device.

A transient-voltage-suppression diode may be either unidirectional or bidirectional. A unidirectional device operates as a rectifier in the forward direction like any other avalanche diode, but is made and tested to handle very large peak currents.

A bidirectional transient-voltage-suppression diode can be represented by two mutually opposing avalanche diodes in series with one another and connected in parallel with the circuit to be protected. While this representation is schematically accurate, physically the devices are now manufactured as a single component.

A transient-voltage-suppression diode can respond to over-voltages faster than other common over-voltage protection components such as varistors or gas discharge tubes. The actual clamping occurs in roughly one picosecond, but in a practical circuit the inductance of the wires leading to the device imposes a higher limit. This makes transient-voltage-suppression diodes useful for protection against very fast and often damaging voltage transients. These fast over-voltage transients are present on all distribution networks and can be caused by either internal or external events, such as lightning or motor arcing.

Transient voltage suppressors will fail if they are subjected to voltages or conditions beyond those that the particular product was designed to accommodate. There are three key modes in which the TVS will fail: short, open, and degraded device.

TVS diodes are sometimes referred to as transorbs, from the Vishay trademark TransZorb.

Characterization 
A TVS diode is characterized by:
 Leakage current: the amount of current conducted when voltage applied is below the maximum reverse standoff voltage.
 Maximum reverse standoff voltage: the voltage below which no significant conduction occurs.
 Breakdown voltage: the voltage at which some specified and significant conduction occurs.
 Clamping voltage: the voltage at which the device will conduct its fully rated current (hundreds to thousands of amperes).
 Parasitic capacitance: The nonconducting diode behaves like a capacitor, which can distort and corrupt high-speed signals. Lower capacitance is generally preferred.
 Parasitic inductance: Because the actual over voltage switching is so fast, the package inductance is the limiting factor for response speed.
 Amount of energy it can absorb: Because the transients are so brief, all of the energy is initially stored internally as heat; a heat sink only affects the time to cool down afterwards. Thus, a high-energy TVS must be physically large. If this capacity is too small, the over voltage will possibly destroy the device and leave the circuit unprotected.

See also 
 Trisil
 Zener diode
 Surge protector

References

Further reading 
 TVS/Zener Theory and Design Considerations; ON Semiconductor; 127 pages; 2005; HBD854/D. (Free PDF download)

External links 

  What are TVS diodes, Semtech Application Note SI96-01
 Transient Suppression Devices and Principles, Littelfuse Application Note AN9768
 Transil™ / Trisil™ Comparison, ST application note AN574
 Transient Protection Solutions: Transil™ diode versus Varistor, ST application note AN1826

Diodes
Voltage stability
Electric power systems components